Lodeynoye Pole (also Lodynoye Pole) is a former air base in Leningrad Oblast, Russia located 2 km south of Lodeynoye Pole. It was home to the 177th Fighter Aviation Regiment PVO between 1960 and 2009.

Lodeynoye Pole initially operated the Sukhoi Su-9 (NATO: Fishpot) in the 1960s and 1970s.  The regiment replaced it in 1980 with the Mikoyan-Gurevich MiG-23P (NATO: Flogger-G).

Around 1994 the MiG-23 was upgraded to the Sukhoi Su-27 (NATO: Flanker).

References

External links
RussianAirFields.com

Soviet Air Force bases
Russian Air Force bases
Soviet Air Defence Force bases